Risin' Outlaw is the debut studio album by American country music singer Hank Williams III. It was released on September 7, 1999, by Curb Records. The album was produced by Chuck Howard and Bob Campbell-Smith. 

Williams has stated that he despises this album in particular and considers his next album Lovesick, Broke and Driftin' as his real debut. In an interview Williams gave with Country Standard Time, he said, "I'm not happy with it. I hate it; can't even listen to but maybe two songs on it. I said (to the label) that every damn interview that I do I ain't gonna talk good about it. Curb thinks this album is so different and so alternative. It's a headache." Risin' Outlaw was part of a record deal Williams had signed in the mid-1990s in an attempt to resolve a paternity dispute and pay child support for his estranged son, Coleman Finchum.

Track listing

Personnel

Hank Williams III - vocals, guitar
Greg Morrow - drums
Dale Crover - drums
Jason Brown - upright bass
Brent Rowan - guitars
J. T. Corenflos - guitars
Michael Spriggs - guitars
Rob Hajacos - fiddle
Dan Dugmore - steel guitar
Kayton Roberts - steel guitar
Paul Franklin - steel guitar
Vernon Derrick - fiddle, mandolin
Curtis Young - backing vocals
Neil Thrasher - backing vocals

Chart performance

References

Hank Williams III albums
1999 debut albums
Curb Records albums